Brasil '88 is the 1978 studio album by Sérgio Mendes. This album features vocals by Marietta Waters, Carol Rogers and Cruz Baca.

Track listing

Personnel
 Keyboards - Sérgio Mendes
 Bass - Nathan Watts
 Drums - Raymond Pounds, Alex Acuña
 Guitar - Michael Sembello, Oscar Castro-Neves, Nelson Angelo
 Percussion - Laudir de Oliveira, Naná Vasconcelos, Emil Richards, Kenneth Nash, Sérgio Mendes
 Vocals - Marietta Waters, Carol Rogers
 Violin - Harry Bluestone, Paul Shure, Nathan Ross, Murray Adler, Henry Ferber, Shirley Cornell, Gordon Marron, Israel Baker, Arnold Belnick, Stanley Plummer, Assa Drori, Ralph Silverman, Sheldon Sanov, Ronald Folson, Don Palmer, Carl La Magna, David Frisina, Tibor Zelig
 Viola - David Schwartz, Richard Dickler, Virginia Majewski, Samuel Boghossian, Gareth Nuttycombe, Alan Harshman, Rollice Dale
 Cello - Jeff Solow, Douglas Davis, Raymond Kelley, Edgar Lustgarden
 Harp - Dorothy Remsen
 Flute and piccolo - Bud Shank, Gene Cipriano, Terry Harrington, Ted Nash, Ronald Langinger, Jerome Richardson, Ernie Watts, Don Menza
 Trumpet and flugelhorn - Chuck Findley
 Trombone - Frank Rosolino
 Baritone sax - Ernie Watts
 Tenor sax - Don Menza
 Soprano sax - Jerome Richardson
 French horn - David Duke, Richard Perissi, Vincent DeRosa
 Horn and string arrangements - Richard Hazard
 Orchestra manager - Ben Barrett

References

1978 albums
Sérgio Mendes albums
Elektra Records albums
Albums arranged by Sérgio Mendes
Portuguese-language albums